James Somerville (June 7, 1834 – May 24, 1916) was an Ontario journalist, newspaper editor and political figure. He was a Liberal member of the House of Commons of Canada who represented Brant North from 1882 to 1896 and Wentworth North and Brant from 1896 to 1900.

He was born in Dundas, Upper Canada in 1834 and educated there and in Simcoe. In 1854, he became editor and owner of the Ayr Observer. In 1858, he returned to Dundas, where he established the True Banner. In the same year, he married Jeanette Rogers. Somerville served as mayor of Dundas in 1874 and was warden for Wentworth County.

He died in Dundas in 1916.

Electoral record

References 
The Canadian parliamentary companion, 1891, JA Gemmill
 
The Canadian men and women of the time : a handbook of Canadian biography, HJ Morgan (1898)

1834 births
1916 deaths
Mayors of places in Ontario
Members of the House of Commons of Canada from Ontario
Liberal Party of Canada MPs
Politicians from Hamilton, Ontario